Bossa Nova U.S.A.  is a studio album released by the Dave Brubeck Quartet in 1963 by Columbia originally in the United States as LP record CS 8798 (stereo) and CL 1998 (mono) and in England as SBPG 62127.  It was also released by CBS in Australia, as catalog SPB 233.038.

Background and recording
Since 1955, Brubeck had composed and performed pieces originating from influences outside of the European musical tradition, in which this album, released during the bossa nova craze in the United States of the late 1950s and early 1960s, can be best categorized.  It is intended to be "impressionistic" of "the cool wave from Brazil."  Recorded through most of 1962, and released early in 1963, the album was designed to be effective on the pop charts.  All tracks were recorded in New York City.  Five tracks were recorded on January 3, 1962 in a session dedicated to bossa nova.  Two additional tracks were recorded on Thursday, July 5 that year in another dedicated session, while an additional two were recorded the same day the next week in a session with an additional track that appeared on the 1965 album My Favorite Things.  The last track to be recorded was the title track, laid down on October 25, 1962 in a session that also included three songs appearing elsewhere.  This album sits in stark contrast to the "time"-themed series of albums, in that each track is typified simply by a samba-based rhythm.

Release
In advance of the album, the title track was released as a single (Columbia 42651) in the last week of 1962, with "This Can't Be Love" as the B-side. This met with moderate success, peaking at #69 on the Billboard Hot 100.  The album followed soon in early 1963.

Reception
On release, Billboard called the album "first-class Brubeck."  While noting the number of bossa tracks, it particularly singled out a re-working of The Trolley Song as a standout track.  The Age expected the record to be popular with the general public, but noted "purists will wince."  The album found more success with the public than the single, appearing for fifteen weeks on Billboards album charts, achieving position #14.

In 1998 the album was released in Japan as a CD, in mini LP format, in the "Sony Master Sound" series as Sony Records SRCS 9364.

Track listing 
All tracks composed by Dave Brubeck, except where indicated:

Personnel
 Dave Brubeck – piano
 Paul Desmond – saxophone
 Joe Morello – drums
 Eugene Wright – double bass

References

1963 albums
Columbia Records albums
Dave Brubeck albums
Albums produced by Teo Macero
Instrumental albums